The 2010–11 National League 2 South was the second season (24th overall) of the fourth tier of the English domestic rugby union competitions since the professionalised format of the second division was introduced.  The league system was 4 points for a win, 2 points for a draw and additional bonus points being awarded for scoring 4 or more tries and/or losing within 7 points of the victorious team.  In terms of promotion the league champions would go straight up into National League 1 while the runners up would have a one-game playoff against the runners up from National League 2 North (at the home ground of the club with the superior league record) for the final promotion place.

Ealing Trailfinders finished the season as champions pipping newly promoted Jersey to the title by just four points in a season where both sides dominated the league.  Jersey did join Ealing in the 2011–12 National League 1 by beating the 2010–11 National League 2 North runners up Loughborough Students in a playoff game watched by 3,000 fans in Saint Peter, Jersey.  At the opposite end of the table, Newbury Blues had a terrible season, suffering a third consecutive relegation dropping to National League 3 South West, having won just one game and conceded over 2,000 points (a divisional all-time worst which also included a record 132–0 defeat by Old Albanian).  Joining Newbury in relegation would be Hinckley who dropped to National League 3 Midlands, while the third and final place went to the wire with relegation rivals Canterbury and Westcombe Park meeting in a rescheduled game on the 7 May 2011 – a week after the season had finished. Westcombe Park won 25–18 at Canterbury to condemn the Kent side to National League 3 London & SE. The season was also notable for the incredible try scoring feats of Ealing Trailfinders winger Phil Chesters who scored an amazing 70 tries in 27 games – an English league record, as well as the dedicated support for Jersey who had regular attendances of over a thousand – outstanding for tier 4.  Chesters also became the first top try scorer in the league to also become the top points scorer as well.

Participating teams
Eleven of the teams listed below participated in the 2009–10 National League 2 South season; Newbury Blues were relegated from National League 1, Jersey (champions) and Old Albanian (playoffs) were promoted from National League 3 London & SE while Taunton were promoted from National League 3 South West. In order to address an imbalance between divisions – Hinckley were transferred from National League 2 North having achieved a late promotion from National League 3 Midlands as a consequence of Ampthill being stripped of that divisions title due to a breach of RFU rules.

League table

Results

Round 1

Round 2

Round 3

Round 4

Round 5

Round 6

Round 7

Round 8

Round 9

Round 10

Round 11

Round 12

Round 13 

Postponed.  Game rescheduled to 5 February 2010.

Postponed.  Game rescheduled to 5 February 2010.

Postponed.  Game rescheduled to 5 February 2010.

Postponed.  Game rescheduled to 5 February 2010.

Round 14 

Postponed.  Game rescheduled to 26 February 2011.

Postponed.  Game rescheduled to 26 February 2011.

Postponed.  Game rescheduled to 26 February 2011.

Postponed.  Game rescheduled to 26 February 2011.

Postponed.  Game rescheduled to 26 February 2011.

Postponed.  Game rescheduled to 26 February 2011.

Postponed.  Game rescheduled to 26 February 2011.

Postponed.  Game rescheduled to 26 February 2011.

Round 15 

Postponed.  Game rescheduled to 5 February 2011.

Postponed.  Game rescheduled to 23 March 2011.

Round 16 

Postponed.  Game rescheduled to 7 May 2011.

Postponed.  Game rescheduled to 23 March 2011.

Postponed.  Game rescheduled to 23 March 2011.

Postponed.  Game rescheduled to 23 March 2011.

Postponed.  Game rescheduled to 5 February 2011.

Postponed.  Game rescheduled to 26 April 2011.

Postponed.  Game rescheduled to 23 March 2011.

Postponed.  Game rescheduled to 23 March 2011.

Round 17

Round 18

Round 19

Round 20

Rounds 13, 15 & 16 (Rescheduled games)

Rescheduled from 27 November 2010.

Rescheduled from 27 November 2010.

Rescheduled from 27 November 2010.

Rescheduled from 11 December 2010.

Rescheduled from 18 December 2010.

Rescheduled from 27 November 2010.

Round 21

Round 22

Round 14 (Rescheduled games)

Rescheduled from 4 December 2010.

Rescheduled from 4 December 2010.

Rescheduled from 4 December 2010.

Rescheduled from 4 December 2010.

Rescheduled from 4 December 2010.

Rescheduled from 4 December 2010.

Rescheduled from 4 December 2010.

Rescheduled from 4 December 2010.

Round 23

Round 24

Rounds 15 & 16 (Rescheduled games) 

Rescheduled from 18 December 2010.

Rescheduled from 18 December 2010.

Rescheduled from 18 December 2010.

Rescheduled from 18 December 2010.

Rescheduled from 11 December 2010.

Rescheduled from 18 December 2010.

Round 25

Round 26

Round 27

Round 28

Round 29

Round 16 (Rescheduled game) 

Rescheduled from 18 December 2010.

Round 30

Round 16 (Rescheduled game) 

Rescheduled from 18 December 2010.

Promotion play-off
Each season, the runners-up in the National League 2 South and National League 2 North participate in a play-off for promotion into National League 1.  Jersey were runners-up in the South and would host the game as they had a better record in the league in comparison to the North runners up Loughborough Students.

Total season attendances

Note that a large number of attendances are missing due to poor record keeping (see below for more detail).  Also be aware that Jersey's playoff game does not count in the regular season attendances.

Individual statistics 

 Note that points scorers includes tries as well as conversions, penalties and drop goals.  Does not include North–South playoff game.

Top points scorers

Top try scorers

Season records

Team
Largest home win — 132 pts
132–0 Old Albanian at home to Newbury Blues on 26 March 2011
Largest away win — 80 pts
90–10 Ealing Trailfinders away to Newbury on 22 January 2011
Most points scored — 132 pts
132–0 Old Albanian at home to Newbury Blues on 26 March 2011
Most tries in a match — 20 (x3)
Jersey at home to Newbury Blues on 6 November 2011
Ealing Trailfinders at home to Hinckley on 12 March 2011
Old Albanian at home to Newbury Blues on 26 March 2011
Most conversions in a match — 16 (x2)
Old Albanian at home to Newbury Blues on 26 March 2011
Ealing Trailfinders at home to Lydney on 30 April 2011
Most penalties in a match — 7
Dings Crusaders at home to Southend on 6 November 2011
Most drop goals in a match — 1
N/A – multiple teams

Player
Most points in a match — 37
 Richard Gregg for Old Albanian at home to Newbury Blues on 26 March 2011
Most tries in a match — 7 (x2)
 Phil Chesters for Ealing Trailfinders at home to Newbury Blues on 2 October 2010
 Phil Chesters for Ealing Trailfinders at home to Lydney on 30 April 2011
Most conversions in a match — 16
 Richard Gregg for Old Albanian at home to Newbury Blues on 26 March 2011
Most penalties in a match — 7 
 Mitch Burton for Dings Crusaders at home to Southend on 6 November 2011
Most drop goals in a match — 1
N/A – multiple players

Attendances
Highest — 2,000   
Jersey at home to Richmond on 12 February 2011
Lowest — 50 
Hinckley at home to Ealing Trailfinders on 6 November 2010
Highest Average Attendance — 1,103
Jersey
Lowest Average Attendance — 99
Hinckley

See also
 English rugby union system
 Rugby union in England

References

External links
 NCA Rugby

2010–11
2010–11 in English rugby union leagues